Erald Lakti (born 6 January 2000) is a football player who plays as a midfielder for Italian  club Lecco. Born in Italy, Lakti represents Albania internationally.

Club career

Fiorentina
He is a product of Fiorentina youth teams and started playing for their Under-19 squad in the 2017–18 season.

He was called up to the senior squad for the last game of the 2018–19 Serie A season, but remained on the bench.

He made his debut for the senior squad in 2019 International Champions Cup.

Loan to Gubbio
On 1 August 2019 he joined Serie C club Gubbio on loan.

He made his professional Serie C debut for Gubbio on 25 August 2019 in a game against Triestina. He substituted Rafa Muñoz in the 52nd minute. He first appeared in the starting lineup on 1 September 2019 against Virtus Verona.

Loan to Renate
On 22 September 2020, he joined Renate on loan.

Lecco
On 8 July 2021, he joined Lecco on a permanent basis.

International career
Lakti represents Albania internationally at youth level.

References

External links
 

2000 births
Living people
People from Prato
Sportspeople from the Province of Prato
Italian people of Albanian descent
Italian footballers
Albanian footballers
Association football midfielders
Serie C players
ACF Fiorentina players
A.S. Gubbio 1910 players
A.C. Renate players
Calcio Lecco 1912 players
Albania youth international footballers
Footballers from Tuscany